Splinter Creek is a rural locality in the North Burnett Region, Queensland, Australia. In the  Splinter Creek had a population of 31 people.

History 
Mount Cannindah State School opened on 1918 and closed on circa 1920.

Splinter Creek Bridge State School opened on 3 April 1934 and closed on 6 October 1958.

In the  Splinter Creek had a population of 31 people.

References 

North Burnett Region
Localities in Queensland